HMS Gossamer was a  of the British Royal Navy. She was built at Sheerness Dockyard from 1889–1891. She was converted to a minesweeper in 1909 and continued these duties during the First World War. Gossamer was sold for scrap in 1920.

Design and construction
The Sharpshooter-class was designed under the leadership of William Henry White, the Director of Naval Construction, to be faster and more seaworthy than the preceding prototype torpedo gunboat,  and the three  ships, while carrying a heavier armament. As torpedo gunboats, they were intended to defend the fleet from attack by torpedo-boats, while being capable of carrying out torpedo attacks themselves.

The Sharpshooters were larger than the preceding ships, with a raised forecastle to improve seakeeping. Two triple-expansion steam engines, fed by four locomotive boilers, drove two propeller shafts. The use of locomotive boilers was not a success, with the machinery being unreliable and unable to provide the expected power. The machinery actually delivered  giving a speed of  when forced and  giving  under natural draft.

The ship was armed with two 4.7 inch (120 mm) QF guns mounted fore and aft on the ships centreline, backed up by four 3-pounder (47 mm) guns (two in single mounts on the ship's beam and two in casemates forward). Five 14-inch torpedo tubes were fitted (one fixed in the ship's bow and two twin mounts), with three reload torpedoes carried. The ship had a crew of 91.

Gossamer was laid down at Sheerness Dockyard on 21 January 1889 and launched on 9 January 1890. She was completed on 16 September 1891 at a cost of £54,490.

Service
Gossamer was used for a series of trials at Chatham on the effects of forced versus induced draught (i.e. air being blown through the boiler versus air being pulled through the boiler) in 1893 and 1894. In August 1894 Gossamer took part in that year's Naval Manoeuvres. On 26 June 1897 Gossamer was present at the Jubilee Fleet Review at Spithead,

Gossamer  was refitted with Reed water-tube boilers in 1902. In 1906 she was in commission as a tender to HMS Pembroke, the base ship at Chatham for training ratings in the operation of water tube boilers. In 1909  she joined the Home Fleet, commissioning at Devonport. In June 1909 she took part in that year's naval manoeuvres, deploying to Berehaven in Ireland. Late that year Gossamer  was converted to a minesweeper, which involved removing the torpedo tubes.

In May 1910 Gossamer was sent to Haulbowline for refit, with her crew transferring to the sloop . On 6 November 1910, Gossamer was operating in Weymouth Bay when one of her boats capsized while heading to Portland, with two of her crew drowned. In May 1911 she temporarily replaced the sloop  on fishery protection duties operating out of Invergordon. In 1912 Gossamer joined the 1st Fleet.

First World War
On the outbreak of the First World War Gossamer joined the newly established Grand Fleet at Scapa Flow in Orkney. In August 1914, the minesweepers attached to the Grand Fleet, including Gossamer were employed on carrying out daily sweeps of the Pentland Firth. In October 1914 Gossamer was based at Devonport.

Speedwell rammed the submarine, which turned over onto her side before disappearing. U-41 had both periscopes damaged and was forced to abort her patrol and return to home.

Gossamer was a member of the Second Fleet Sweeping Flotilla, based at Scapa Flow as part of the Grand Fleet, in July 1917. At the end of the war she was based at Oban in the west of Scotland as part of the 13th Minesweeping Flotilla.

Fate
Gossamer was sold for scrap on 20 March 1920 to the Cornish Salvage Company of Ilfracombe.

Pennant numbers

Notes

References

Bibliography

 

Sharpshooter-class torpedo gunboats
Ships built in Sheerness
1890 ships